Uvanga ('I, me, mine') is a Canadian drama film, released in 2013. Written and directed by Marie-Hélène Cousineau and Madeline Ivalu, it was the second narrative feature film released by Arnait Video Productions.

The film stars Marianne Farley as Anna, a woman from Montreal who once had a relationship with Caleb, an Inuk man from Igloolik, Nunavut; after learning of Caleb's death, she takes their 14-year-old son Tomas (Lukasi Forrest) on a trip to Nunavut to learn more about his Inuit heritage. Sarah (Ivalu), Caleb's mother and Tomas' grandmother, tries to keep the peace between Anna and Caleb's widow Sheba (Carol Kunnuk), while Tomas bonds with his half-brother Travis (Travis Kunnuk) and Anna begins to suspect that Sheba's new boyfriend Barrie (Peter-Henry Arnatsiaq) may know more about Caleb's death than he has admitted.

The film garnered three Jutra Award nominations at the 17th Jutra Awards, in the categories of Best Sound (Eric Ladouceur, Luc Mandeville and Lynne Trépanier), Best Editing (Glenn Berman) and Best Original Music (Alain Auger).

References

External links
 

2013 films
Canadian drama films
Quebec films
Inuit films
Films set in Nunavut
Films shot in Nunavut
2010s Canadian films